This is a list of diplomatic missions in Cyprus. There are currently 44 embassies in Nicosia. Several other countries have non-resident embassies.

Embassies/High Commissions in Nicosia

Other missions in Nicosia 
 (Embassy branch office)

Non-resident embassies and high commissions 

Resident in Athens, Greece:

 

 

 

Resident in Rome, Italy:

 

Resident in Tel Aviv, Israel:

 
 

Resident in Beirut, Lebanon:

 

Resident in London, United Kingdom:

Resident in Cairo, Egypt:

Resident in Paris, France:

Resident elsewhere:

 (Geneva)
 (Sofia)
 (Rabat)
 (Jerusalem)
 (Stockholm)
 (Geneva)
 (Brussels)
 (Riyadh)
 (Sofia)
 (Berlin)
 (Vienna)
 (Singapore)
 (San Marino)

Embassies to open
Future embassies to open, include:

See also 
 Foreign relations of Cyprus
 List of diplomatic missions in Northern Cyprus

References

External links

 List of embassies

 
Diplomatic missions
Cyprus
Diplomatic missions